Francis Taliaferro Brooke (August 27, 1763 – March 3, 1851) was a Virginia lawyer, soldier, politician and judge.  He served in both houses of the Virginia General Assembly before fellow legislators elected him to the Virginia Supreme Court of Appeals (which later became the Supreme Court of Virginia), where he served decades and became that body's fourth President (now called Chief Justice).

Early life and education

Brooke was born in Spotsylvania County, Virginia. His parents were Richard Brooke of Smithfield and Ann Hay Taliaferro (of one of the First Families of Virginia). They were the uncle and aunt of Major General Dabney Herndon Maury. His elder brother Robert Brooke would become governor of Virginia, and another brother, Lawrence Brooke, was the surgeon of the Bon Homme Richard, commanded by John Paul Jones. Like his brothers, Brooke received a private education from tutors and in private grammar schools in Fredericksburg.

During the American Revolution Brooke was active in the militia and served on General Greene's staff with the rank of lieutenant. At the end of the war he studied medicine for a year, but then decided to study law in his brother Robert’s office.  Francis T. Brooke was a member of the Society of the Cincinnati of the State of Virginia.

Career

After admission to the bar in 1788, Brooke traveled westward to the Ohio River and practiced in Monongalia and Harrison counties (in what after the American Civil War would become West Virginia). However, Brooke returned to the Chesapeake bay area and was elected Commonwealth’s Attorney (prosecutor) for Essex County, Virginia, where he also had a private legal practice and would be was elected to the House of Delegates in 1794. Two years later he moved nearer his family's home in Fredericksburg and won election to the State Senate in 1800.

After the Revolution, Brooke remained active in the Virginia militia and was promoted to the rank of major in 1796, lieutenant colonel in 1800 and brigadier general in 1802.  He was an original member of the Virginia Society of the Cincinnati.

In 1811, fellow legislators elected Brooke a judge of the Supreme Court of Appeals, his fellow judges made his president of that court for eight years, from 1823 to 1831. The legislature re-elected Brooke as judge in 1831, and he continued in office until his death on March 3, 1851.

Personal life and death

Judge Francis Brooke married twice, and survived his eldest son, who died in Macau. In 1791, Francis Brooke married Mary Randolph Spottswood Brooke (1775–1803) and their children who survived to adulthood included John Francis Brooke (1795–1849), Robert Spotswood Brooke (1800–1851) and Mary Randolph Spotswood Brooke Berkeley (1803–1875). The widower remarried in 1804, to Mary Champe Carter Brooke (1788–1846), who bore John Brooke (b. 1805), Francis Edward Brooke (1813–1874) and Helen Brooke Forman (1821–1899). Judge Brooke was buried at the Brooke family cemetery in Spotsylvania County, where he joined his first wife, and would be joined by other family members. His grandson, also Francis Taliaferro Brooke (1846-1913), would join the Confederate States Army as a private and survive the American Civil War, in which the family lost all their enslaved property.

References 

1763 births
1851 deaths
Virginia state senators
Justices of the Supreme Court of Virginia
Virginia lawyers
Taliaferro family of Virginia
People from Spotsylvania County, Virginia
Virginia militiamen in the American Revolution